Charmian Colette "Charmie" Sobers (born 19 January 1973 in Willemstad, Curaçao) is a retired Dutch taekwondo practitioner of Curaçaoan descent. Sobers qualified for the Netherlands in the women's welterweight category (67 kg) at the 2004 Summer Olympics in Athens by finishing third and receiving a berth from the European Qualification Tournament in Baku, Azerbaijan. Sobers outclassed Great Britain's Sarah Bainbridge in the preliminary round of sixteen before losing out the quarterfinal match to Philippines' Mary Antoinette Rivero with a default score of 4–10.

References

External links

1973 births
Living people
Dutch female taekwondo practitioners
Olympic taekwondo practitioners of the Netherlands
Taekwondo practitioners at the 2004 Summer Olympics
Dutch people of Curaçao descent
Curaçao female martial artists
People from Willemstad
20th-century Dutch women
21st-century Dutch women